Ironbark is a rural locality in the City of Ipswich, Queensland, Australia.

Geography

The eastern boundary of Ironbark is marked by the Brisbane Valley Highway and the southern boundary follows the Warrego Highway.

References

External links

 University of Queensland: Queensland Places: Marburg, Haigslea, Ironbark

City of Ipswich
Localities in Queensland